This is a list of notable people connected to the University of Calcutta.

Fourteen heads of state and government, and four Nobel laureates have been associated with the university.

Fellows
 Joseph Baly, Archdeacon of Calcutta from 1872 until 1883
 Lal Behari Dey, Bengali Indian journalist who became a Christian missionary
 Ralph Thomas Hotchkin Griffith, British Indologist
 Thomas Holbein Hendley, British medical officer in the Indian Medical Service and Indian art connoisseur
 Nawab Abdul Latif, Bengali nineteenth-century educator
 James Wood-Mason, British zoologist who was director of the Indian Museum in Calcutta

Faculty

Alumni

Arts

Business

Humanities and Social Sciences

Law

Literature

Military

Politics

Heads of State and Government

Others

Civil Servants and Diplomats

Royalty and Nobility

Religion

Science and Technology

Chandramukhi Basu, one of the first two female graduates of the British Empire; first female head of an undergraduate academic institution in South Asia
Sasanka Chandra Bhattacharyya, natural product chemist, Shanti Swarup Bhatnagar laureate
Katyayanidas Bhattacharya, Philosophy, Professor, Presidency College, Calcutta
Santanu Bhattacharya, Chemical Biologist, Shanti Swarup Bhatnagar laureate, N-Bios laureate 
Birendra Bijoy Biswas, molecular biologist
Nirmal Kumar Bose, Census Commissioner of India
Barun De, Chairman, West Bengal Heritage Commission, Calcutta
Amlan Dutta, former Vice Chancellor of Visva-Bharati University, Santiniketan
Mircea Eliade, religious scholar and philosopher
Prafulla Chandra Ghosh, English literature scholar
Sankar Ghosh Chairman of Department of Microbiology and Immunology at Columbia University; co-founder of Theralogics Inc.
K. S. Krishnan, philosopher
Dhan Gopal Mukerji, socio-cultural critic; first successful man of letters in the early 20th-century United States
Kamini Roy, first female honours graduate in the British Empire; first feminist author in India
Prafulla Chandra Roy, chemist
Sir Jadunath Sarkar, Vice Chancellor of the University of Calcutta
Debi Prasad Sarkar, immunologist, Shanti Swarup Bhatnagar laureate
Brajendra Nath Seal, Vice Chancellor of Visva-Bharati University and the University of Mysore
Ashoke Sen, string theorist
Dinesh Chandra Sen, scholar of early Bengali literature
Ranjan Sen, biophysicist, N-Bios laureate
Sanjib Senapati, biotechnologist, N-Bios laureate
Debasis Chattopadhyay, plant biologist, N-Bios laureate

Sports

Notes

References

Calcutta
 
Kolkata-related lists